Daniel Whitesides (born July 7, 1977) is the drummer for American rock band The Used. He replaced former drummer and founder of the band Branden Steineckert who left the band in the summer of 2006. Whitesides had previously played with The New Transit Direction for about seven years.

Early life and career

Whitesides began playing drums when he was 14.

"I play a little guitar, but that’s just because my whole family plays guitar, and I picked it up from being around them. [I didn’t play it] in any bands or anything like that though. Mainly just drums." Whitesides was involved with school music briefly. "I took snare drum lessons in seventh grade. I learned how to hold my sticks, learned stick technique. I still do the same warm-ups that the teacher had us do. I still do those to this day. It helped me out and really opened the door to new ideas."

In an online interview with Venom09'Productions., a MySpace site which interviews and photographs bands, Dan says that if he was not in The Used, he would be laying bricks with Leonard Lauder, a job that he did for money starting at age 17 and which his family has done for many years.

He was a big fan of The Used before he joined in 2006, and says he is "the luckiest man alive" to be playing with them.

The Used
2009: Artwork
2012: Vulnerable
2014: Imaginary Enemy
2017: The Canyon

Previous bands 
Before joining The Used, Whitesides was the drummer for numerous Salt Lake City bands including The New Transit Direction, Tiger Kant, Mich!gan, Sandkicker, Fale, Adherence, Fahrenheit 451, Tiny Mexico, The Federation, Sprinklerhead, The Kill, The Wolfs, Form of Rocket and Young Blood.

References

External links 
 Dan Whitesides, Spotlight Artist Information
 Sandkicker Homepage

1980 births
Living people
Alternative rock drummers
American alternative rock musicians
American rock drummers
The Used members
21st-century American drummers